Microplumeria  is a genus of flowering plants in the family Apocynaceae, first described as a genus in 1889. It contains only one known species, Microplumeria anomala, native to the Amazon Basin of Venezuela, Colombia, and Brazil.

References

Flora of the Amazon
Monotypic Apocynaceae genera
Rauvolfioideae
Taxa named by Henri Ernest Baillon
Taxa named by Johannes Müller Argoviensis
Taxa named by Friedrich Markgraf